is a Japanese manga series written and illustrated by Kazuhiro Kumagai. It was serialized across three Shueisha's seinen manga magazines from 1997 to 2002: Weekly Young Jump, Young Jump Zōkan Mankaku and Bessatsu Young Jump. Its chapters were collected in seven tankōbon volumes. Another series, Samurai Gun Gekkō, was serialized in Ultra Jump from 2000 to 2003. A 13-episode anime television series, directed by Kazuhito Kikuchi and animated by Studio Egg, was broadcast in 2004. The anime series was licensed in North America by ADV Films, which co-financed the series' production.

Plot
It is the beginning of the Industrial Revolution, and feudal Japan is in turmoil. The ruling Shogun are wielding their abusive powers to instill fear and dominance over their oppressed subjects. Beatings, imprisonment, rape, and even murder are the adopted tactics chosen to maintain their reign. A group of samurai have banded together to end the bloodshed. With the development of new weapons and new technology, this group of fighters has both the will and the equipment to fight back. Ichimatsu, one of the samurai fighters, works at a local tavern as a cover for his real job. By the dark of night he doles out some big-time, gun-barrel justice under the name "Samurai Gun".

Characters

Ichimatsu

One of the samurai guns. 
Daimon

Another samurai gun who works many missions with Ichimatsu. His cover during the day is a teacher, and he owes a large tab to the tavern owner Ichimatsu works for.
Kurenai

Ohana

Shunkai Matsuzaki

Media

Manga
Written and illustrated by Kazuhiro Kumagai, Samurai Gun was serialized across three Shueisha's seinen manga magazines from 1997 to 2002: Weekly Young Jump, Young Jump Zōkan Mankaku and Bessatsu Young Jump. Shueisha collected its chapters in seven tankōbon volumes; the first six volumes were published from June 19, 1998, to October 18, 2002, and the seventh volume was released two years later on October 19, 2004.

Another series, titled , was serialized in Ultra Jump from the October 2000 to the December 2003 issues. Its chapters were collected in four tankōbon volumes, released from July 19, 2001, to Februry 19, 2004.

Anime
A 13-episode anime television series, produced by Avex Mode and ADV Films, animated by Studio Egg, directed by Kazuhito Kikuchi, with series composition by Hideki Sonoda, was broadcast on TV Asahi from October 5 to December 14, 2004; the last two episodes aired as a single hour-long finale, and the 13th episode did not air on the network during the series' run.

The series was licensed in North America and the United Kingdom by ADV Films; in North America, the series was released on four DVDs from August 16, 2005, to February 14, 2006, while in the United Kingdom the four DVDs were released from October 16, 2006, to April 16, 2007. A "Complete Collection" volume was released in North America on February 20, 2007.

In Australia and New Zealand, the series was licensed by Madman Entertainment, who released the series on four DVDs from December 7, 2005, to March 29, 2006; a "Complete Collection" volume was released on May 2, 2007.

Episode list

Notes

References

External links
 

ADV Films
Alternate history anime and manga
Samurai in anime and manga
Seinen manga
Shueisha franchises
Shueisha manga
Steampunk anime and manga
TV Asahi original programming